General elections were held in Uganda on 18 February 2011. Incumbent President Yoweri Museveni of the National Resistance Movement (NRM) was re-elected for a third time, having been in power since 1986. The NRM also won 263 of the 375 seats in Parliament.

Background
Museveni, a former guerilla commander, had ruled Uganda for nearly 30 years at the time of the elections. Kizza Besigye and Museveni faced each other for the third time, having previously been allies; Besigye was defeated by Museveni in the 2001 and 2006 elections.

Campaign
At the time of the elections, Uganda was facing a potential oil shock, which became a campaign issue.

Eight candidates contested the presidential elections, whilst a total of 1,713 candidates ran in the parliamentary elections; 1,270 for the constituency seats and 443 for the women's seats. The NRM contested every constituency seat, putting forward a total of 364 candidates. The Forum for Democratic Change nominated 288, the Uganda People's Congress 135, the Democratic Party 120, the Uganda Federal Alliance 66, the People's Progressive Party 33, and the People's Development Party 18.

Conduct
European Union observers said the election was "marred by avoidable and logistical failures, which led to an unacceptable number of Ugandan citizens being disenfranchised."

Results

President

Parliament

Aftermath
The four-party Inter-Party Cooperation chairman Kizza Besigye said before the results were announced that the opposition "categorically rejects the outcome of the elections."  He later warned that Uganda was ripe for an Egypt-style revolt after Museveni's more than two decades in power. However, the protesters failed to amass in large numbers because, as The Christian Science Monitor suggested, a failure to tally its own results through its own SMS system was disrupted by the government, who also arrested hundreds of opposition field agents. They also suggested that Besigye did not believe his own claim of sparking a revolution. After losing out twice to Museveni – whose personal physician and loyal ally he once was – this third attempt seems to have shattered him.

References

Further reading

Uganda
2011 in Uganda
Elections in Uganda
Presidential elections in Uganda

de:Parlamentswahlen in Uganda 2011